Robert John Manno (born October 31, 1956) is a Canadian-born Italian former professional ice hockey forward. He was born in Niagara Falls, Ontario.

Manno started his National Hockey League career with the Vancouver Canucks in 1976. He also played with the Toronto Maple Leafs and Detroit Red Wings. He participated in the 1982 NHL All-Star Game. He retired from the NHL after the 1985 season.

Then he went to Italy, playing for HC Merano, HC Fassa, HC Milano Saima (won one national title in 1990/91) and ended his career for HC Bolzano Foxes, winning a total of 3 Italian titles and 1 Alpenliga. Manno also played for the Italian national team on several occasions including at the A Pool of the 1982 World Ice Hockey Championships and 1983 World Ice Hockey Championships and at the 1992 Olympics.

After his retirement he began a new career as ice hockey coach in Italy (HC Bolzano, HC Milano 24, HC Merano and Asiago Hockey AS), then in Germany (Frankfurt Lions, Augsburger Panther, Straubing Tigers).

Career statistics

Regular season and playoffs

International

External links 

Bob Manno at Niagara Falls' Virtual Sports Wall of Fame

1956 births
Living people
Canadian people of Italian descent
Adirondack Red Wings players
Bolzano HC players
Canadian ice hockey forwards
Dallas Black Hawks players
Detroit Red Wings players
Hamilton Red Wings (OHA) players
HC Merano players
HC Milano players
HC Milano Saima players
Sportspeople from Niagara Falls, Ontario
Ice hockey people from Ontario
Ice hockey players at the 1992 Winter Olympics
Niagara Falls Flyers players
Olympic ice hockey players of Italy
Quebec Nordiques (WHA) draft picks
St. Catharines Black Hawks players
Serie A (ice hockey) players
SHC Fassa players
Toronto Maple Leafs players
Tulsa Oilers (1964–1984) players
Vancouver Canucks draft picks
Vancouver Canucks players
Canadian expatriate ice hockey players in Italy
Canadian expatriate ice hockey players in the United States